The Martinique macaw or orange-bellied macaw (Ara martinicus) is a hypothetical extinct species of macaw which may have been endemic to the Lesser Antillean island of Martinique, in the eastern Caribbean Sea. It was scientifically named by Walter Rothschild in 1905, based on a 1630s description of "blue and orange-yellow" macaws by Jacques Bouton. No other evidence of its existence is known, but it may have been identified in contemporary artwork. Some writers have suggested that the birds observed were actually blue-and-yellow macaws (Ara ararauna). The "red-tailed blue-and-yellow macaw" (Ara erythrura), another species named by Rothschild in 1907 based on a 1658 account, is thought to be identical to the Martinique macaw, if either one ever existed.

The Martinique macaw is one of 13 extinct macaw species that have been proposed to have lived in the Caribbean islands. Many of these species are now considered dubious because only three are known from physical remains, and there are no extant endemic macaws on the islands today. Macaws were frequently transported between the Caribbean islands and the South American mainland in both prehistoric and historic times, so it is impossible to know whether contemporaneous reports refer to imported or native species.

Taxonomy

The Martinique macaw was scientifically described by the British zoologist Walter Rothschild in 1905, as a new species of the macaw genus Anodorhynchus; A. martinicus. The taxon was solely based on a 1630s account by the French priest Jacques Bouton of blue and orange-yellow macaws from the Lesser Antillean island of Martinique. Rothschild reclassified the species as Ara martinicus in his 1907 book, Extinct Birds, which also contained a restoration of the bird by the Dutch artist John Gerrard Keulemans. The reassignment led to confusion as recently as 2001, when the American ornithologists Matthew Williams and David Steadman assumed the two names were meant to refer to separate birds. The Martinique amazon (Amazona martinicana) of the same island, was also based solely on a contemporary description.

What Bouton described is likely to remain a mystery, but various theories have been proposed. In 1906, the Italian zoologist Tommaso Salvadori noted that the Martinique macaw seemed similar to the blue-and-yellow macaw (Ara ararauna) of mainland South America, and may have been the same bird. The American ornithologist James Greenway suggested Bouton's description could have been based on a captive bird. Edwards' Dodo, a 1626 painting by the Dutch artist Roelant Savery, shows several birds including a blue and yellow macaw, which is different from the mainland bird in having yellow undertail covert feathers instead of blue, but the origin of this macaw is unknown. Another macaw in the painting may be the also extinct Lesser Antillean macaw (Ara guadeloupensis). Another Savery painting from about the same time shows a similar blue and yellow macaw, as does a mid-1700s illustration by the English naturalist Eleazar Albin. In 1936, the Cuban scientist Mario Sánchez Roig claimed to have found a stuffed Martinique macaw specimen, which was supposed to have been collected in 1845. After examination the same year, the American ornithologist John T. Zimmer showed it to be a hoax, combining a burrowing parakeet (Cyanoliseus patagonus byroni) with the tail of a dove.

In the article that named the Martinique macaw, Rothschild also listed an "Anodorhynchus coeruleus", supposedly from Jamaica. Salvadori also questioned this in 1906, as he was unsure what Rothschild was referring to. In his Extinct Birds, Rothschild clarified that his first description was erroneous, as he had misread an old description. He renamed it Ara erythrura, based on a 1658 description by the French pastor Charles de Rochefort, and conceded that its provenance was unknown. This supposed species subsequently received common names such as "red-tailed blue-and-yellow macaw" and "satin macaw" in the ornithological literature. Greenway suggested Rochefort's description was dubious, as he had never visited Jamaica, and appeared to have based his account on one by the French friar Jean-Baptiste Du Tertre. If either bird ever existed, Ara erythrura is likely to have been identical to the Martinique macaw, according to the British ornithologists Julian P. Hume and Michael Walters. Other similar blue and yellow macaws, such as the "great macaw" ("Psittacus maximus cyanocroceus") were also reported from Jamaica. Birdlife International does not have an entry for the Martinique macaw, but it was mentioned in that of the Lesser Antillean macaw (which is considered Not Recognized) as possibly identical.

Extinct Caribbean relatives

Macaws are known to have been transported between the Caribbean islands and from mainland South America both in historic times by Europeans and natives, and prehistoric times by Paleoamericans. Parrots were important in the culture of native Caribbeans, were traded between islands, and were among the gifts offered to Christopher Columbus when he reached the Bahamas in 1492. It is therefore difficult to determine whether the numerous historical records of macaws on these islands refer to distinct, endemic species, since they could have been based on escaped individuals or feral populations of foreign macaws of known species that had been transported there. As many as 13 extinct macaws have been suggested to have lived on the islands until recently. Only three endemic Caribbean macaw species are known from physical remains; the Cuban macaw (Ara tricolor) is known from 19 museum skins and subfossils, the Saint Croix macaw (Ara autochthones) is only known from subfossils, and the Lesser Antillean macaw is known from subfossils and reports. No endemic Caribbean macaws remain today; they were likely driven to extinction by humans in historic and prehistoric times.

Many hypothetical extinct macaws were based only on contemporaneous accounts, but these species are considered dubious today. Several of them were named in the early 20th century by Rothschild, who had a tendency to name species based on little tangible evidence. Among others, the red-headed macaw (Ara erythrocephala) and the Jamaican red macaw (Ara gossei) were named for accounts of macaws on Jamaica, and the Dominican green-and-yellow macaw (Ara atwoodi) was supposedly from Dominica island. The violet macaw (Anodorhynchus purpurascens), which was named for accounts of blue parrots supposedly from Guadeloupe, is now thought to have been based on references to the Guadeloupe amazon (Amazona violacea).

Other species of macaw have also been mentioned, but many never received binomials, or are considered junior synonyms of other species. Williams and Steadman defended the validity of most named Caribbean macaw species, and wrote that each Greater and Lesser Antillean island probably had its own endemic species. The ornithologists Storrs Olson and Edgar Maíz López doubted the validity of the hypothetical macaws in 2008, and that all Antillean islands once had endemic species, but wrote that the island of Hispaniola would be the most likely place for another macaw species to have existed because of the large land area, though no descriptions or remains of such are known. They wrote that such a species could have been driven to extinction before the arrival of Europeans. The identity and distribution of indigenous macaws in the Caribbean is only likely to be further resolved through palaeontological discoveries and examination of contemporary reports and artwork.

Contemporary descriptions

Bouton's 1630s description of the Martinique macaw is reproduced below, translated from French:

A translation of the 1658 French description of "Ara erythrura" by de Rochefort follows below:

In spite of the fact that the tail of "Ara erythrura" was described as entirely red, the plate in Rothschild's Extinct Birds showed a blue tip, which the American ornithologist Charles Wallace Richmond complained about in his review of the book.

References

Ara (genus)
Extinct birds of the Caribbean
Hypothetical extinct species
Bird extinctions since 1500
Macaws
Controversial parrot taxa
Birds described in 1905
Endemic fauna of Martinique
Birds of Martinique